The discography of English singer Zayn consists of three studio albums, seventeen singles (including four as a featured artist), six promotional singles and, ten music videos.

After leaving One Direction in 2015, Zayn signed a solo recording contract with RCA Records that year. His debut studio album, Mind of Mine, was released on 25 March 2016. The album and its lead single, "Pillowtalk", reached number one in several countries, with Malik becoming the first British male artist to debut at number one in both the UK and US with a debut single and debut studio album. Zayn released his second studio album, Icarus Falls, on 14 December 2018. After a year of releasing a few collaborations, he released his third studio album, Nobody Is Listening, on 15 January 2021.

Studio albums

Mixtapes

Singles

As lead artist

As featured artist

Promotional singles

Other charted songs

Guest appearances

Music videos

Notes

References

Discographies of British artists
Discography